The 1907 season in Swedish football started January 1907 and ended December 1907.

Honours

Official titles

Competitions

Promotions, relegations and qualifications

Promotions

Relegations

Domestic results

Stockholmsserien klass 1 1907

Stockholmsserien klass 2 1907

Göteborgsserien klass I 1907

Svenska Mästerskapet 1907 
Final

Corinthian Bowl 1907 
Final

Kamratmästerskapen 1907 
Final

Wicanderska Välgörenhetsskölden 1907 
Final

Notes

References 
Print

Online

 
Seasons in Swedish football